In India, kitty parties are social events held as part of an informal savings club. It is a kind of party usually organized by women, and commonly held in the afternoon on a monthly basis.

Kitty refers to the amount collected at the party, every member contributing a certain sum of money each month.  The kitty is handed over to one member of the group every month. Chit funds operate along similar principles.

It is usually held at a specified time each month, by a specific group of women. Every member of the group has to host a party at least once. The hosting member organizes food and other logistics. In most of India and Pakistan, it is usually simply referred to as a 'committee'.

The party may include games, and may involve a theme of discussion on a topic with other members.

References 

Parties
Women's events
Women in India
Women in Pakistan
Indian culture
Pakistani social culture
Informal finance
Informal economy in Asia